Joaquim Roderbourg (8 April 1918 – 17 July 1991) was a Brazilian sailor. He competed at the 1956 Summer Olympics and the 1964 Summer Olympics.

References

External links
 
 

1918 births
1991 deaths
Brazilian male sailors (sport)
Olympic sailors of Brazil
Sailors at the 1956 Summer Olympics – Finn
Sailors at the 1964 Summer Olympics – Flying Dutchman
Sportspeople from Düsseldorf